Events from the year 1988 in Taiwan. This year is numbered Minguo 77 according to the official Republic of China calendar.

Incumbents
 President – Chiang Ching-kuo, Lee Teng-hui
 Vice President – Lee Teng-hui
 Premier – Yu Kuo-hwa
 Vice Premier – Lien Chan, Shih Chi-yang

Events

May
 24 May – The 37th Miss Universe pageant at Linkou Stadium in Taipei.

June
 12 June – The opening of National Cheng Kung University Hospital in North District, Tainan City.
 26 June – The opening of National Taiwan Museum of Fine Arts in West District, Taichung City.

August
 11 August – The establishment of Federation of Medical Students-Taiwan.

December
 29 December – The establishment of Ritek.

Births
 19 March – Lin Tzu-chi, taekwondo player
 29 March – Huang Yu-ting, speed skater
 11 April – Yako Chan, singer and actress
 19 May – Lin Fei-fan, activist
 12 June – Nieh Pin-chieh, swimmer
 16 June – Lyan Cheng, actress, model and singer
 30 June – Puff Kuo, model, actress and singer
 26 July – Cheng Kai-wen, baseball player
 29 July – Huang Pei-jia, actress
 2 August – Nick Chou, actor and singer
 11 August – Chen Po-liang, captain of Chinese Taipei national football team
 3 September – Chang Chin-lan, actress
 17 November – Joanne Tseng, singer and television host
 22 November – Lorene Jen, artist
 16 December – Lin Chen-hua, baseball player
 28 December – Lo Chih-en, football player

Deaths
 13 January – Chiang Ching-kuo, President (1978–1988)

 
Years of the 20th century in Taiwan